Juan Eusebio Nieremberg y Ottín (1595 – 7 April 1658) was a Spanish Jesuit and mystic.

Nieremberg was born and died in Madrid, but his parents were German. He studied the classics at the Royal Court, he studied science at Alcalá and canon law at Salamanca.

He joined the Society of Jesus (Jesuits) in 1614, and subsequently became lecturer on scripture at the Jesuit seminary in Madrid until his death.

He was highly esteemed in devout circles as the author of De la afición y amor de Jesus (1630), and De la afición y amor de María (1630), both of which were translated into Arabic, Dutch, French, German, Italian and Latin. These works, together with the Prodigios del amor divino (1641), are now forgotten, but Nieremberg's version (1656) of the Imitation is still a favorite, and his eloquent treatise, De la hermosura de Dios y su amabilidad (1649), is the last classical manifestation of mysticism in Spanish literature.

Works 

 Obras y Días. Manual de Señores y Principes; en que se Propone con su Pureza y Rigor la Especulación y Ejecución Política, Económica y Particular de Todas las Virtudes (Madrid, 1628)
 Centuria de dictámenes prudentes (Quiñones, Madrid, 1641).
 Prolusión a la doctrina e historia natural (Madrid, 1629).
 Sigalion sive de sapientia mythica (Madrid, 1629; Lyon, 1642)
 Curiosa Filosofía y cuestiones naturales (Imprenta del Reino, Madrid, 1630)
 Vida del glorioso Patriarca San Ignacio de Loyola (Madrid, 1631)
 De adoratione in spiritu et veritate (Amberes, 1631)
 De arte voluntatis (Lyon, 1631)
 De la afición y amor de Jesús, (1630?; Madrid, 1632)
 De la afición y amor de María... (1630?; Madrid, 1632)
 Vida Divina y Camino Real de Grande Atajo para la Perfección (Madrid, 1633; 1633)
 
 Oculta Filosofía, (Barcelona, 1645)
 Curiosa y oculta filosofia: primera y segunda parte de las marauillas de la naturaleza, examinadas en varias questiones naturales... Tercera impression añadida por el mismo autor  (Alcalá: Imprenta de María Fernández, a costa de Juan Antonio Bonet, 1649).
 Libro de la vida de Jesús crucificado, impreso en Jerusalén con su sangre (Barcelona, 1634)
 Historia naturae, maxime peregrinae (Amberes, 1634)  
 Trophaea mariana seu de victrice misericordia Deiparae, gefolgt von De virginitate S.S. Dei Matris apologetica dissertatio (Amberes, 1638)
 Del aprecio y estima de la gracia divina, que nos mereció el Hijo de Dios, con su Preciosa Sangre, y Pasión (Juan Sánchez, Madrid, 1638; Hospital Real y General, Zaragoza, 1640)
 Compendio de la vida del V.P. Martin Gutiérrez (Madrid, 1639)
 De la diferencia entre lo temporal y lo eterno, y Crisol de Desengaños (Madrid, 1640, 1654; Imprenta Real, Madrid, 1675)
 Práctica del Catecismo romano y doctrina cristiana (Diego Díaz de la Carrera, Madrid 1640, 1641; Imp. María de Quiñones, Madrid, 1646)
 Vida del dichoso y venerable Padre Marcelo Francisco Mastrilli (Madrid, 1640)
 Flores espirituales en que se proponen varios puntos muy provechosos para las almas (Madrid, 1640)
 Prodigio del amor divino y finezas de Dios con los hombres (Juan Sánchez, Madrid, 1641).
 De la hermosura de Dios y su amabilidad por las Infinitas Perfecciones del Ser Divino (Juan Sánchez, Madrid 1641)
 Theopoliticus sive brevis illucidatio et rationale divinorum operum atque providentia humanorum (Amberes, 1641)
 Causa y remedio de los males públicos (Francisco de Robles, Madrid, 1642)
 Consuelo de las almas escrupulosas y su remedio, (Madrid, 1642). 
 Dictámenes de espíritu (Puebla de Los Ángeles, 1642) 
 Tratado sobre el lugar de los Cantares  Veni de Libano  Explicado de la perfección religiosa (Madrid: Francisco Maroto a costa de Francisco de Robles, mercader de libros, 1642) 
 Ideas de virtud en algunos claros varones de la Compañía de Jesús, para los Religiosos de Ella (María de Quiñones, Madrid, 1643) 
 Doctrinae asceticae sive spiritualium institutionum pandectae (Lyon, 1643)
 Partida a la eternidad y preparación para la muerte, (Madrid, 1643)
 De la devoción y patrocinio de San Miguel (María de Quiñones, Madrid, 1643)
 Corona virtuosa y virtud coronada (Francisco Maroto, Madrid, 1643) 
 Del nuevo misterio de la piedra imßn y nueva descripción del globo terrestre (Madrid, 1643) 
 Firmamento religioso de lucidos astros en algunos claros varones de la Compañía de Jesús (Quiñones, Madrid, 1644)  
 Honor del gran patriarca S. Ignacio de Loyola, fundador de la Compañía de Jesús, en que se Propone su Vida, y la de su Discípulo el Apóstol de las Indias S. Francisco Xavier. Con la Milagrosa Historia del Admirable Padre Marcelo Mastrilli, y las Noticias de Gran Multitud de Hijos del Mismo P. Ignacio, Varones Clarísimos en Santidad, Doctrina, Trabajos, y Obras Maravillosas en Servicio de la Iglesia (Quiñones, Madrid, 1645) 
 Vida del Santo Padre Francisco de Borja (Madrid, 1644) 
 Partida a la eternidad y preparación a la muerte (Imprenta Real, Madrid, 1645)
  Vidas ejemplares y venerables memorias de algunos claros varones de la Compañía de Jesús, de los Cuales es este Tomo Cuarto (Alonso de Paredes, Madrid, 1647)
 De la constancia en la virtud y medios de perseverencia (Madrid, 1647)
 Epistolas del reverendo Padre Juan Eusebio Nieremberg, Religioso de la Compañía de Jesús. Publicadas pour Manuel de Faria y Sousa, Caballero de la Orden de Cristo, y de la Casa Real (por Alonso de Paredes, Madrid, 1649)
 Devocionario del santísimo Sacramento (Madrid, 1649). 
 Cielo estrellado de María (Madrid, 1655)
 Obras cristianas del Padre Juan Eusebio Nieremberg, Tomo I de sus obras en romance (Imprenta Real, Madrid, 1665)
 Obras filosóficas del Padre Juan Eusebio Nieremberg, Tomo III (Imprenta Real, Madrid, 1664)
 Obras cristianas (Lucas Martín de Hermosilla, Sevilla, 1686) 
 Vida de Santa Teresa de Jesús (Madrid, 1882)

Eponymy
The Spanish botanists Ruiz and Pavón (Hipólito Ruiz López and Jose Antonio Pavón y Jimenez) named an attractive plant in the tobacco family, Nierembergia, after him in their Flora Peruvianae, et Chilensis Prodromus (1794).

References

External links
Nieremberg, Juan Eusebio (1635) Historia naturæ, maxime peregrinae, libris xvi. discincta... -digital facsimile from the Linda Hall Library
Complete digital facsimiles of works by Juan Eusebio Nieremberg at the John Carter Brown Library

1595 births
1658 deaths
17th-century philosophers
17th-century Christian mystics
Roman Catholic mystics
Spanish essayists
Spanish male writers
Spanish philosophers
17th-century Spanish Jesuits
Male essayists
17th-century male writers